The Hunted is a 1977 crime novel written by Elmore Leonard.

Plot summary
Al Rosen stuck his neck out to help the Detroit government put some goons in prison, only it didn't go according to plan. He is living in Israel off the checks sent his way by the company he helped found. The checks are brought to him by the untrusty sleazy lawyer Mel Bandy. Rosen spends his days hanging out in hotel lobbies, getting sun, and just simply staying out of sight. But one fateful night there's a hotel fire that draws the attention of the media and Rosen gets photographed and wound up getting his face in the Detroit Free Press. Now Rosen's enemies know where he is and they immediately descend on the Holy Land for the purpose of killing him. Sgt. David Davis is about to finish his tour with the marines. The big problem is that he has no idea what to do with himself once he is out. Now Rosen is on the run in Israel with three killers and a sleazy lawyer on his tail and a U.S. Marine for company. Can this Vietnam vet U.S. Marine keep Rosen safe.....

Characters in The Hunted
Al Rosen – businessman in the witness protection program
Tali Rose – assistant to Rosen
Edie Broder – Rosen's girlfriend
Sgt. David Davis – U.S. marine
Mel Bandy – sleazy lawyer
Gene Valenzuela – Detroit city mobsters leader
Clarence Rashad – Detroit city mobster
Teddy Cass – Detroit city mobsters explosive expert

Notes

External links
The Hunted at Elmore Leonard.com

1977 American novels
Novels by Elmore Leonard
Novels set in Israel
Novels set in Detroit